This article contains a list of railway stations in Colombia.  Few of these stations are currently served by passenger services since the state-owned Ferrocarriles Nacionales de Colombia (National Railways of Colombia) liquidated in the 1990s. This list includes systems which had been incorporated into the national system and others, and numerous stations that were served by passenger services in 1953.  Some stations between Bogotá and Zipaquirá are served occasionally by Tren Turistico de la Sabana.  There is currently regular daily passenger service provided by Coopsercol around Barrancabermeja.

List

Ferrocarril del Occidente
(Opened in 1889)

 Bogotá La Sabana railway station, the main station of Bogotá
 a station of Bogotá Puente Aranda
 Estación del Ferrocarril Fontibón, at Bogotá Fontibón
 a station at Mosquera
 a station at Madrid
 a station at Facatativá

Ferrocarril del Sur
 a station at Bosa 
 a station at Soacha 
 a station at Alicachín, opened in 1916
 Estación Santa Isabel, in Sibaté, opened in 1926
 a station at San Miguel, opened in 1930

Ferrocarril del Norte

 Estación M. A. Caro, known as "La Caro", at Puente del Común (junction), opened in 1894 
 a station at Cajicá, opened in 1896
 a station at Zipaquirá, opened in 1898
 a station at Nemocón - opened in 1907
Estación Usaquén, Bogotá

Ruta Cúcuta-Pamplona

Estación Bochalema

Ferrocarril del Nordeste

 Estación San Antonio, Bogotá
 a station at Chapinero
 a station at Calle 100
 a station at Usaquén
 Estación M. A. Caro, at Puente del Común (junction)
 a station at Briceño (Sopó)
 a station at Tocancipá
 a station at Gachancipá
 a station at Suesca

Ferrocarril del Oriente
 La Requilina (Usme)

Ferrocarril de Cúcuta

Ferrocarril de Cúcuta (see Ferrocarril de Cúcuta (Spanish-language wikipedia)) had more than 20 stations, including Estación Cúcuta itself.

Other Lines
 Buenaventura (Pacific Ocean port)
 Cali

Vale 
 Puerto Córdoba - for coal export from 2009

Timeline

2012 

 proposed/rebuilt line to Carare for coal export
 Puerto Berrio (Atlantic Ocean port)
 Cundinamarca (coal mine)
 Boyacá (coal mine)
 Santander (coal mine)

External links 
 2007 UNHCR Map

See also 
 Rail transport in Colombia
 Transport in Colombia

References 

Railway stations in Colombia
Railway stations
Colombia
Railway stations